Kepler Orellana (born 8 October 1977) is a male former professional tennis player from Venezuela.

Orellana reached his highest individual ranking on the ATP Tour on June 7, 1999, when he became World number 304.  He primarily played on the Futures circuit and the Challenger circuit.

Orellana was a member of the Venezuelan Davis Cup team, having posted a 6–6 record in singles and a 5–2 record in doubles in nine ties played from 1998 to 2004.

Orellana represented Venezuela at the 2002 Central American and Caribbean Games in San Salvador, El Salvador, winning the silver medal in the men's singles event while taking the bronze medal in both the men's doubles and men's team events.  Orellana also represented Venezuela at the 2003 Pan American Games in Santo Domingo, Dominican Republic, reaching the third round in the men's singles event and reaching the quarterfinals in the men's doubles event.

ATP Challenger & ITF Futures

Singles Titles (6)

External links
 
 
 

1977 births
Living people
Venezuelan male tennis players
Central American and Caribbean Games silver medalists for Venezuela
Central American and Caribbean Games bronze medalists for Venezuela
Competitors at the 2002 Central American and Caribbean Games
Central American and Caribbean Games medalists in tennis
Tennis players at the 2003 Pan American Games
Pan American Games competitors for Venezuela
Sportspeople from Barquisimeto
20th-century Venezuelan people
21st-century Venezuelan people